The Cry of the Children is a 1912 American silent short drama film directed by George Nichols for the Thanhouser Company. The production, based on the poem by Elizabeth Barrett Browning about child labor, stars Marie Eline, Ethel Wright, and James Cruze. At the time of its release, the film proved to be controversial for its use of real-life footage of children working inside a large textile factory. The film in 2011 was selected into preservation in the National Film Registry by the Library of Congress for being "culturally, historically, or aesthetically significant".

Cast
Marie Eline as Alice, the little girl
Ethel Wright as The working mother
James Cruze as The working father
Lila Chester as The factory owner's wife
William Russell as The factory owner

References

External links                                                                                         
The Cry of the Children essay by Ned Thanhouser  at National Film Registry 
The Cry of the Children at thanhuser.org 

1912 films
United States National Film Registry films
Silent American drama films
American silent short films
American black-and-white films
1912 drama films
Thanhouser Company films
Films directed by George Nichols
Articles containing video clips
1912 short films
1910s American films